Awn "Hussein" Al Khashlok (Arabic: عون حسين الخشلوك; February 3, 1961) is an Iraqi businessman and media person. He is the founder of the Al-Khashlok Group for Investment and Al-Baghdadia Media Group.

Early life and education
Dr. Awn Hussein Al-Khashlok was born in Qalat Sukkar town in the Dhi Qar Governorate, Iraq. He is the third son of Hajj Hussein al-Khashlok, a well-known merchant in the southern region of Iraq during the first half of the 20th century through his trade in grain and dates in Basra and Nasiriyah and exporting goods to Arab States of the Persian Gulf and other countries. He belongs to Banu ‘Omer which is part of Rabi`ah tribes. Awn left Iraq early when his father sent him to study abroad after he finished his high school in 1979.

Career
Al-Khashlok lived abroad since then and never returned to his country until after the war of 2003 for studying. During these years he settled in Greece after obtaining BSc, Masters then PhD in civil engineering. His work was divided between trade, construction, real estate and manufacturing. He founded Al-Khashlok Group for Investment which is operating in Europe, United States, UK, Africa, UAE, Turkey and other countries.

He founded Al-Baghdadia TV satellite channel in 2005.

Official website
 Al-Khashlok Group
 Al-Baghdadia Media Group
 Al-Baghdadia Satellite Channel at Al-Baghdadia

References

1961 births
Living people
Iraqi businesspeople
Iraqi Shia Muslims
Iraqi mass media people
People from Dhi Qar Province
Iraqi engineers
Naturalized citizens of Greece
Greek people of Iraqi descent